Wilson Township is an inactive township in Dallas County, in the U.S. state of Missouri.

Wilson Township was established in 1921, taking its name from President Woodrow Wilson.

References

Townships in Missouri
Townships in Dallas County, Missouri